The Okaw Group is a geologic group in Kentucky. It preserves fossils dating back to the Carboniferous period .

See also

 List of fossiliferous stratigraphic units in Kentucky

References

 

Geologic groups of Kentucky